Ann Leda Shapiro (born 1946) is an American artist. Ann Leda Shapiro was born and raised in New York City.  She later attended the San Francisco Art Institute (BFA, 1969) and the University of California Davis (MFA, 1971).  Shapiro's work was shown in a 1973 solo exhibition at the Whitney Museum of American Art. After a public outcry, The Whitney censored two works by the artist; "Anger" and "Two Sides of Self (the mermaids)" both of which contained sexually explicit imagery of hermaphrodites. Forty-seven years later "Anger" was shown in a group show of censored artworks at Central Washington University's Gallery One.   Shapiro is also the author of the book "My Island," published in 2009.

Permanent Collections 
Her work is included in the collections of the: 

 Seattle Art Museum
 University of Colorado Boulder Art Museum.

References

1946 births
20th-century American women artists
21st-century American women artists
Living people
Censorship